The Academy of Military Medical Sciences (AMMS) of the PLA Academy of Military Science is a Chinese military medical research institute. It was established in Shanghai in 1951. It has been based in Beijing since 1958.

In October 2011, the drug "Night Eagle", developed to help soldiers cope with sleep deprivation during missions, was unveiled in an exhibition marking the institute's 60th anniversary.

In December 2014, the Chinese government announced that the Academy of Military Medical Sciences had developed an Ebola virus vaccine candidate that had been approved for clinical trials. 

In December 2021, the United States Department of Commerce added the Academy of Military Medical Sciences to the Entity List, accusing it of aiding in the Uyghur genocide.

COVID-19 vaccine 

During the COVID-19 pandemic, the AMMS partnered with CanSino Biologics to develop Convidecia. The development team, led by Chen Wei, registered a Phase 1 trial in March 2020 and a Phase 2 trial in April 2020. It conducted its Phase III trials in Argentina, Chile, Mexico, Pakistan, Russia, and Saudi Arabia with 40,000 participants.

In February 2021, global data from Phase III trials and 101 COVID cases showed the vaccine had a 65.7% efficacy in preventing moderate symptoms of COVID-19, and 91% efficacy in preventing severe disease.  It has similar efficacy to the Janssen vaccine, another one-shot adenovirus vector vaccine with 66% efficacy in a global trial. Convidecia is also similar to other viral vector vaccines like the Oxford–AstraZeneca vaccine and Sputnik V vaccine. Its single-dose regimen and standard refrigerator storage requirement (2°to 8 °C) could make it a favorable vaccine option for many countries.

Convidecia is approved for use by some countries in Asia, Europe, and Latin America. Production capacity for Ad5-NCov should reach 500 million doses in 2021. Manufacturing will take place in China, Malaysia, Mexico, and Pakistan.

The vaccine was the first one approved outside of clinical trials in an expedited decision, which authorized its use only by the Chinese military.

See also 
 Wu Dechang, radiation toxicologist and former President of AMMS
 JK-05

References

External links 
 

Research institutes established in 1951
Medical research institutes in China
People's Liberation Army
Military research of China
Military medical organizations
1951 establishments in China